This is a list of medieval stone churches in Finland. A total number of 104 fieldstone churches were built between the 13th and 16th century, of which 83 have been preserved. Numbers include the sacristies of uncompleted churches as well as three churches in Vyborg which is now part of Russia.

The book, first published in 2003, builds on the chronology first put forth in Hiekkanen's 1994 doctoral thesis "The Stone Churches of the Medieval Diocese of Turku: A Systematic Classification and Chronology." Until Hiekkanen's research, which is based in statistical interpretation of field observations using "a systematic database of comparative criteria," most of the churches were generally considered 100–200 years older.

While Hiekkanen's dates represent those most frequently used by state museums and the Finnish Heritage Agency, his work is not universally accepted and scholars have disagreed with various elements of his research, including his methods and certain dates offered. Åsa Ringbom of Åbo Akademi University, an art historian and one of the principal researchers of the Åland Churches Project, has offered dates for the construction of the stone churches of Åland that, in some cases, differ from Hiekkanen's by a century or more. Hiekkanen has consistently dismissed the interdisciplinary methods used by Ringbom and his colleagues – which include a combined study of written sources, stylistic dating, archeological finds, dendrochronology, and mortar dating, among other modes – and, conversely, Ringbom has called into question Hiekkanen's lack of transparency regarding his methodological principals and limited incorporation of data which fall outside of his model.

The provinces in this list refer to the historical provinces of Finland, which were replaced by the regions of Finland in 1634, and differ from the former provinces of Finland, which were in use during 1634 to 2009.

Number of churches by province

Finland Proper

Karelia

Ostrobothnia

Satakunta

Savonia

Tavastia

Uusimaa

Åland

Sources

See also
 Architecture of Finland

External links 

Finland
Medieval stone churches